The Crown and Horseshoes is a grade II listed public house in Horseshoe Lane, Enfield.

References

External links

Enfield, London
Pubs in the London Borough of Enfield
Grade II listed pubs in London